Arnetta ellipsis is a species of butterfly in the family Hesperiidae. It is found in northern, central and eastern Madagascar. The habitat consists of forest margins, cleared forests and anthropogenic environments.

References

Butterflies described in 1884
e
Butterflies of Africa
Taxa named by Max Saalmüller